Barbro Hietala Nordlund, born 1946, is a Swedish social democratic politician, member of the Riksdag first 1994–1998 and then again 2001–2006.

References

Members of the Riksdag from the Social Democrats
Living people
1946 births
Members of the Riksdag 2002–2006